Sujawal , town is headquarter of Sujawal district of Sindh. Previously, it was Sub Divisional Headquarter of Sujawal Sub Division of  Thatta District, Sindh, Pakistan. The Government of Sindh has granted Sujawal the status of a district and after the approval of Chief Minister Sindh, a notification has been issued by Revenue Department on 12 October 2013. The new district would comprise Sujawal, Kharochan, Mirpur Bathoro, Jati and Shah Bander talukas. It is located at about 20 km west of Thatta on the road Badin to Karachi. Sujawal is an agricultural city with a few industries located near it. Sujawal is a multi community and ethnic city containing different sects and religions.

Sujawal's climate is moderate, winter is cold and summer is bit hot. As well humidity in this area too. Sujawal is near the sea. During winter seasonal birds migrate from Siberia and Russia in this area lakes. In Indus river there is famous fish called Palla, is famous in this area, now breeding of that fish is diminishing every year due to water shortage in river Indus. It has been a political centre of the District, mainstream parties in Sujawal include the Pakistan People's Party, Muttahida Qaumi Movement-Pakistan, Jamiat Ulema-e-Islam (F), Pakistan Muslim League (N), JUP, PMLF, JSQM, PPPSB and others. There are two Provincial Assembly seats PS 86 and PS 87 and one National Assembly seat NA 238 in the District Sujawal.

History 
According to historian Aziz Jafrani, the town of Sujawal was originally known as Maanjar because of its wetlands. The late 16th-century Ain-i-Akbari lists Maanjar as one of the 18 mahals of the Sarkar of Thatta, with a yearly revenue of 1,221,752 dams. The name "Sujawal" dates from the time of the Talpur dynasty, in the late 1700s: a fisherman named Sujawal Khaskheli, who came from the village of Maanjar, correctly predicted the birth of a son to Mir Fateh Ali Khan Talpur, the ruler of Sindh. Mir Fateh Talpur rewarded him with gifts of land and precious jewels, as well as renaming the village of Maanjar to Sujawal in his honor.

References

Populated places in Sujawal District
Sujawal District